The U.S. Pro Stock/Super Late Model Championship was a 200 lap super late model race held annually at Seekonk Speedway. The event was aimed at creating a race similar to the Snowball Derby in New England.

The race was scheduled to run the Wednesday before the Monster Energy NASCAR Cup Series runs their July race at New Hampshire Motor Speedway, in hopes of gaining the attention of Cup teams and encouraging them to enter the race.

Race setup
The rules for the 200 lap race were very lenient, allowing competitors from across the country come to the track in hopes of winning a $10,000 pay check. All cars were required to run the same American Racer racing slicks used by Seekonk's weekly pro stock competitors. The race itself was a non-points race for the Whelen All-American Series. Racing action was separated into two 100 lap race segments. The time between the two 100 lap races is used to host other racing (In the case of 2016, pro-4 modifieds and legends. Qualifying was split into heat races, where 20 drivers (including guaranteed-starters) will qualify. A final six positions were filled in by consolation races. Between the two 100 lap races, the winner of the first 100 laps draws a number to determine an inversion for the second 100 lap feature.

Several New England race tracks host their own super late model races, some of which were used as guaranteed-starter races. Which races were and weren't used as guaranteed-starter races were determined before the racing season started. The whole event was sponsored by Kraze Korlacki Speed Equipment, who offered payouts and promoted the race. It was up to their discretion how many cars are eligible for the race, but 26 was the number used to explain race procedure. There was a $47,160 total prize; $42,160 coming from Kraze Korlacki Speed Equipment, and $5,000 coming from lap sponsorship. Anyone was eligible to sponsor a lap for $25.

Race winners

By year

2016
The race's finish was voted second best in Speed51's best finishes of 2016.

2017

2018

References

Annual sporting events in the United States
Seekonk, Massachusetts